General Sir Charles William Adair  (15 April 1822 – 27 December 1897) was a Royal Marines officer who served as Deputy Adjutant-General Royal Marines.

Military career
Adair was born in Plymouth, the son of Maj.-Gen. Thomas Benjamin Adair   Adair was appointed a lieutenant in the Royal Marines on 12 February 1842. He became colonel and second commandant at the Chatham Division on 16 February 1872, Assistant Adjutant-General at Headquarters Royal Marine Forces on 30 October 1872. and colonel-commandant of the Portsmouth Division on 29 July 1876. He went on to be Deputy Adjutant-General Royal Marines (the professional head of the Royal Marines) in September 1878 before retiring in September 1883.

He was appointed Aide-de-Camp to the Queen in 1870. In 1871, he was appointed a Companion of the Order of the Bath (CB) and knighted in the same order in 1882.

He married Isabella Aslett daughter of Col. Thompson Aslett. He was the father of Rear-Admiral Thomas Benjamin Stratton Adair.

References

1822 births
1897 deaths
Royal Marines generals
Knights Commander of the Order of the Bath
Military personnel from Plymouth, Devon